Małgorzata Cybulska (born 28 March 1998) is a Polish equestrian. She represented Poland at the 2020 Summer Olympics and competed in Individual and Team Eventing on her horse Chenaro.

Cybulska suffered from discopathy and underwent a spinal operation in 2019.

References 

1998 births
Living people
Polish female equestrians
Olympic equestrians of Poland
Equestrians at the 2020 Summer Olympics
Event riders